is a 1996 run and gun arcade video game originally developed by Nazca Corporation and released by SNK for the Neo Geo MVS. It is the first installment in the eponymous series. Set in 2028, players assume the role of Peregrine Falcon Strike Force soldiers Marco Rossi and Tarma Roving on a fight against the Rebel Army led by Donald Morden and overthrow his coup d'état to prevent a New World Order.

Metal Slug was conceived by the same staff who created several titles at Irem that shared similar presentation such as In the Hunt and GunForce II, with the core concept during development being a simple but exciting side-scrolling shooter featuring a very easy control scheme and visuals inspired by the works of Hayao Miyazaki. Gameplay was originally more slower-paced, revolving around players controlling the titular tank instead of soldiers across shorter and less complex missions with a darker atmosphere, before the project was heavily overhauled after poor response during location test and the length was extended at the request of SNK to make the game attractive to home players while incorporating more platform elements into its design.

Metal Slug garnered positive reception upon its initial launch from players and critics, being lauded for its sense of humor, fluid hand-drawn animation and fast-paced two-player action. The game was subsequently ported to other platforms by other third-party developers, featuring various changes and additions compared to the MVS original, in addition to being included on compilations and re-released through download services for other systems, among other ways to play it. Its success led to a franchise spawning multiple sequels, remakes and spin-offs. A direct continuation, Metal Slug 2, was released in 1998.

Gameplay 

Metal Slug is a run and gun game reminiscent of Contra where players assume the role of captain Marco Rossi and lieutenant Tarma Roving of the Peregrine Falcon Strike Force, shooting constantly at a continual stream of enemies in order to complete each mission. At this point, players confront a boss, who is usually considerably larger and tougher than regular enemies. On the way through each level, players can find numerous weapon upgrades and the eponymous tanks. Known as the SV-001 and SV-002, the tanks increase the player's offense and add considerably to their defense.

In addition to shooting, players can perform melee attacks by using a knife. The player does not die by coming into contact with enemies, and correspondingly, many of the enemy troops have melee attacks. Much of the game's scenery is destructible, and occasionally, this reveals extra items or power-ups. During the course of a level, the player encounters prisoners of war (POWs), who, if freed, offer the player bonuses in the form of random items or weapons. At the end of each level, the player receives a scoring bonus based on the number of freed POWs. If the player dies before the end of the level, the tally of freed POWs reverts to zero. Getting hit by enemy fire, colliding against solid stage obstacles or falling off-stage will result in losing a life and once all lives are lost, the game is over unless players insert more credits into the arcade machine to continue playing.

There are a total of six missions taking place across locations such as forests, garrisoned cities, snowy mountain valleys, canyons, and military bases. The vast majority of enemies are soldiers equipped with weaponry befitting their specific role. There are several mechanized enemies, such as tanks, mobile artillery, aircraft, armored personnel carriers and technicals. Much of the game's humor comes from how the enemies are depicted; the player often encounters them as they are sunbathing, roasting food over a fire, or conversing. They tend to scream loudly if they see the player, and often try to either run away or fight back.

Development 

Metal Slug was developed by most of the same team that previously worked on several projects at Irem like In the Hunt and GunForce II before departing from the company and forming Nazca Corporation. Kawai and Takashi Nishiyama served as chief development manager and producer respectively. Kazuma "Kire-Nag" Kujo and Meeher acted as co-designers. Shinichi "Hamachan" Hamada, Kenji "Andy" Andō, Atsushi Kurooka (currently of PlatinumGames), T. Yokota, H. Yamada and "Pierre" Takada worked as programmers. Artists Akio Oyabu, Susumu,  Kazuhiro "Max.D" Tanaka,  Tomohiro, Takeshi Okui (currently of Monolith Soft) and Kozo were responsible for the pixel art. Composers Takushi "Hiya!" Hiyamuta and Jim scored the soundtrack. The team recounted the project's development process and history through various publications.

Metal Slug was first playable during a location test at Osaka and later showcased to attendees at the 1995 Amusement Machine Show from September 13 to 15. The plot was similar to the final version but revolved around Regular Army members Phil Gene and Michiko Nakajima controlling the SV-001 and SV-002 prototype tanks instead.

Release 

Metal Slug was first released by SNK for the Neo Geo MVS arcade system on April 19, 1996 and later for the Neo Geo AES on May 24. The North American AES release has since become one of the more expensive titles on the platform, with copies of the port fetching over US$20,000 on the secondary video game collecting market. On July 5 the same year a Neo Geo CD version of the game was also released, featuring a "Combat School" mode that allowed players to revisit previously-played missions with new objectives.

Between April and August 1997, Sega Saturn and PlayStation versions developed by SNK and Ukiyotei respectively were released only in Japan. Though software market was being dominated by polygon-based games, Neo Geo conversions for Saturn and PlayStation were selling well in Japan, motivating SNK to produce ports of Metal Slug as well. To retain all animations frames of the arcade original, the Saturn version used newer compression techniques, inter-level loading and the 1 MB RAM expansion cartridge. The Saturn release was available in two revisions; 1.002 and 1.005, which included some minor bug fixes. Both ports feature "Combat School" mode from the Neo Geo CD release while the PlayStation version features a new mode, "Another Story", consisting of plot-based minigames, and an art gallery featuring concept art (characters, vehicles, weapons, levels).

A Game Boy Advance port was announced to be in development but was never released to the public. In 2006, Metal Slug was included alongside its arcade sequels as part of Metal Slug Anthology for the Wii, PlayStation 2, PlayStation Portable, PC in 2009 (as Metal Slug Collection PC) as well as PlayStation 4 in 2020 by Limited Run Games, being an emulated iteration of the arcade original without additional game modes or content featured in previous home releases. In 2008, the game was included as part of SNK Arcade Classics Vol. 1 for Wii, PlayStation 2 and PSP, as well as being re-released by D4 Enterprise on the Wii's Virtual Console. In 2010, a version by M2 for the NEOGEO Station service was published by SNK Playmore on PlayStation Network. In 2012, a wireless version was released by DotEmu for iOS and Android.

Metal Slug is available as one of the 20 pre-loaded games with the Neo Geo X and was also included in the Neo Geo 25th Anniversary Humble Bundle, released in 2015. Hamster Corporation re-released Metal Slug for the PlayStation 4, Xbox One and Nintendo Switch between December 2016 and March 2017 under their Arcade Archives series. The game was also recently included in the international version of the Neo Geo mini, the Neo Geo Arcade Stick Pro plug and play game device and the Neo Geo MVSX table top.

Reception and legacy 

Metal Slug garnered positive response upon its initial release. Japanese magazine Game Machine listed the game on their June 1, 1996 issue as being the seventh most-popular arcade game for the previous two weeks. In the United States, it was one of the top ten highest-grossing arcade games of 1996. The Neo Geo, iOS and Nintendo Switch versions hold a 84.50%, 68.33% and 80% respectively on the review aggregator GameRankings. It was included in the 2010 book 1001 Video Games You Must Play Before You Die. According to Famitsu, the "SNK Best Collection" re-release of Metal Slug on PlayStation sold over 8.064 copies in its first week on the market. The PC port sold 156,631 digital copies worldwide on Steam.

Electronic Gaming Monthly heavily criticized the game's unfair difficulty and one-hit deaths, remarking that playing through the arcade version requires an inordinate amount of quarters, while the Neo Geo AES version's lack of an option for limited continues means players of all skill levels can complete it in a single sitting, with no motivation to play again or improve one's skill at the game. However, the four reviewers also concurred that the game is fun, chiefly due to its smooth and humorous animations. GamePros Major Mike agreed that the Neo Geo version suffers from low longevity, with too few levels and a complete lack of replay value, and also criticized the slowdown in the game, but Mike approved of the graphics, music, and arsenal of weapons, and summarized the game as "a soldier-slamming, side-scrolling, tour de force that dwarfs recent side-scrolling Neo shoot-em-ups, including the system's strongest platform offerings like Cyber-Lip and Top Hunter." AllGames Brett Alan Weiss and Kyle Knight praised its unique hand-drawn visual style, refined gameplay, simple controls, intense action, humor and replay value but criticized the game's slowdown when many objects are present on-screen, the overall length and found the music to be average. In conclusion, Knight regarded the title as one of the best side-scrolling shooters on Neo Geo. Jeuxvideo.coms nuktos praised the colorful graphics, humor, gameplay and sound design but criticized its short length.

The Sega Saturn port was well received for being a faithful arcade conversion but critics noted that the game would not work without the 1MB RAM expansion cartridge. Computer and Video Games Steve Rey praised the weapon selection, attention to detail, humor and two-player mode. A reviewer from Next Generation reviewed the Saturn port, stating that "in the end, Metal Slug is not a game players will really obsess over. However, the easy and exciting gameplay will have players returning to it often, which is probably why SNK decided to bring it to the States". Readers of the Japanese Sega Saturn Magazine voted to give the Saturn iteration an 8.6305 out of 10 score, ranking at the number 185 spot. A reviewer of NowGamer criticized the PlayStation conversion for its lack of replay value aside from Combat School mode, however he praised the gameplay for being fun in short-term.

When Metal Slug was re-released on the Virtual Console in 2008, IGNs Lucas M. Thomas scored it 8.5 out of 10, and awarding it an "Editor's Choice" badge. Eurogamers Dan Whitehead wasn't quite as impressed. Despite praising the original game, Whitehead was critical of the port, criticizing the lack of support for online multiplayer, in comparison to the Xbox Live release. Nintendo Lifes Marcel van Duyn praised the sprite work, visuals and fast-paced music. Slide To Plays Andrew Podolsky commended the iOS release for being an enjoyable and fast-paced arcade shooter in addition to its visual presentation, but recommended Metal Slug 3 instead, as he noted that the title was more simple, shorter and lack the gameplay features compared with later entries in the Metal Slug franchise. 148Appss Carter Dotson heavily criticized the iOS version for its control scheme but praised its graphics and sound, as well as the gameplay and replay value. Nintendo Lifes Damien McFerran praised its graphics and humor, although McFerran noted that its overall simplicity compared to later titles in the Metal Slug series may be seen as a shortcoming.

Metal Slug spawned a series of six sequels, a remake and four spin-offs. Marco Rossi appears as a playable character in the tag-team fighting game NeoGeo Battle Coliseum. Several developers have also created games similar to Metal Slug such as Demon Front, CT Special Forces, Alien Hominid, Commando: Steel Disaster, and Mercenary Kings.

Notes

References

External links 

 
 Metal Slug at GameFAQs
 Metal Slug at Giant Bomb
 Metal Slug at Killer List of Videogames
 Metal Slug at MobyGames

1996 video games
ACA Neo Geo games
Arcade video games
Cancelled Game Boy Advance games
Cooperative video games
D4 Enterprise games
Head-to-head arcade video games
IOS games
Linux games
MacOS games
Metal Slug
Multiplayer and single-player video games
Nazca Corporation games
Neo Geo games
Neo Geo CD games
Nintendo Switch games
PlayStation (console) games
PlayStation Network games
PlayStation 4 games
Sega Saturn games
SNK Playmore games
Ukiyotei games
Video games developed in Japan
Video games scored by Takushi Hiyamuta
Video games set in the 2020s
Video games set in Cambodia
Video games set in England
Video games set in Italy
Video games set in Switzerland
Video games with alternate endings
Virtual Console games
Windows games
Xbox One games
Hamster Corporation games